Rhinella nicefori is a species of toad in the family Bufonidae.
It is endemic to Colombia.
Its natural habitat is subtropical or tropical high-altitude grassland.
It is threatened by habitat loss.

References

Rhamphophryne
Amphibians of Colombia
Amphibians of the Andes
Taxonomy articles created by Polbot
Amphibians described in 1970